Thomas F. Bayard served sixteen years in the United States Senate.  The Delaware General Assembly chose the U.S. Senators, who took office March 4, for a six-year term. The U.S. Secretary of State and U.S. Ambassadors are appointed by the President of the United States with the consent of the U.S. Senate.

Bayard, Thomas F.